Calanthe delavayi is a species of plant in the family Orchidaceae. It is endemic to China.

References 

Endemic orchids of China
Vulnerable plants
delavayi
Taxonomy articles created by Polbot